Antaea (Ancient Greek: Ἀνταία), or Antea, was in Greek mythology an epithet of the goddesses Demeter, Rhea, and Cybele. Its meaning is unclear but it probably signifies a goddess whom man may approach in prayers, this name look like "ain tinea" the berbere queen of Algerian desert (Tin Hinan) . It may also have to do with Cybele's hostility to the Telchines.

"Antaea" was also another name for Stheneboea, wife of Proetus.

Notes

Epithets of Demeter
Epithets of Rhea (mythology)
Epithets of Cybele